Count Pavel Sergeyevich Stroganov (Russian:Павел Сергеевич Строганов; (13 April 1823, Saint Petersburg - 17 December 1911, Saint Petersburg) was an art collector, philanthropist, and cup-bearer at the Imperial Court.

Biography 
He was the second son of Count Sergei Grigoryevich Stroganov and his wife, Natalia Pavlovna Stroganova (1796-1872), daughter of Count Pavel Alexandrovich Stroganov, and his cousin. Their marriage had united two separate lines of the Stroganov family.
 
He graduated from the law faculty of Moscow State University in 1845, after which he entered the Ministry of Foreign Affairs and was posted to the embassy in Rome, as Third Secretary, in 1847. Two years later, he was named a Titular Counselor at the ministry and, in 1852, he was appointed Junior Secretary at the embassy in Vienna. In 1855, at his request, he was returned to Rome. The following year, he was awarded the Order of Saint Stanislaus.

In 1851, he married Anna Dmitrievna Buturlina (1825-1906), daughter of the General and Senator, Dmitry Buturlin. She was a founder, and served as a trustee, of the orphanage at the Sergiev Orthodox Brotherhood, for which she was awarded the Order of Saint Catherine in 1891. They had no children.

During his services abroad, he became interested in collecting paintings. Having inherited a house from his grandfather, he began remodeling it to suit his collection; hiring the Court Architect, Ippolit Monighetti, to carry out the work. He effectively turned his home into a museum, featuring early Italian painting and a collection of Chinese prints. In 1861, he organized and exhibition of works from several private collections, as well as the Imperial Collection, at the Imperial Academy of Arts.

As a result, Stroganov used his influence to get Grigorovich an appointment as Secretary at the Imperial Society for the Encouragement of the Arts. He also made a donation to the Society to establish two awards: one for landscape painting, named after his father, and one for sculpture, named after himself. Later, he would donate items from his collection to the Society's museum.

After 1888, he served as a Privy Councilor and Hofmeister. In 1894, he was honored with the position of "обер-шенки"  (cup-bearer). By this time, his collection had grown so large, he found it necessary to store some of the less important works at his estate in Tambov Province.

He died at home, aged eighty-eight, of "heart paralysis" and was interred at the Trinity Lavra of St. Sergius, next to Anna, who had died of a cerebral haemorrhage . The most valuable works from his collection were bequeathed to the Hermitage Museum.

References

Further reading 
 M. F. Korshunova and Sergey Kuznetsov; "The Mansion of Count Pavel Sergeevich Stroganov at 11 Tchaikovsky Street", In: Петербургские чтения, 1997 pp. 440–443
 Sergey Kuznetsov; "Count PS Strogonov as a draftsman, collector and philanthropist: a Short Biography", In: the bulletin of Tambov State University, 2006, pp. 423–426 
 Sergey Kuznetsov, et al.; Сладкое художественное впечатление. Воскресение графа П. С. Строганова, забытого любителя искусств (A Sweet Artistic Impression. The Resurrection of Count P. S. Stroganov, a Forgotten Art Lover), Exhibition catalog, Hermitage Museum Publishing House, 2019,

External links

1823 births
1911 deaths
Nobility from Saint Petersburg
Diplomats from Saint Petersburg
Moscow State University alumni
Russian art collectors
Order of Saint Stanislaus
People from Saint Petersburg